General Burnett may refer to:

Charles Burnett (British Army officer) (1843–1915), British Army general
Charles Burnett (RAF officer) (1882–1945), Royal Air Force general
Henry Lawrence Burnett (1838–1916), Union Army brevet brigadier general
Sir James Burnett, 13th Baronet (1880–1953), British Army major general

See also
John Burnett-Stuart (1875–1958), British Army general